Glyptogrus is a genus of beetles in the family Carabidae, containing the following species:

 Glyptogrus aequatorius (Chaudoir, 1855)
 Glyptogrus bidentatus Banninger, 1956
 Glyptogrus boliviensis (Chaudoir, 1879)
 Glyptogrus glypticus (Perty, 1830)
 Glyptogrus molopinus (Perty, 1830)
 Glyptogrus porosus Banninger, 1935
 Glyptogrus sulcipennis (Chaudoir, 1879)

References

Scaritinae